New Philadelphia is a borough in Schuylkill County, Pennsylvania, United States. The population was 1,060 at the 2020 census.

Geography

Demographics

At the 2010 census there were 1,085 people, 477 households, and 300 families residing in the borough. The population density was 729.85 people per square mile (297.7/km2). There were 477 housing units at an average density of 393.5 per square mile (151.6/km2). The racial makeup of the borough was 91.14% White, 0.55%, and 0.92% from two or more races. Hispanic or Latino of any race were 1.66%.

Of the 477 households, 21.38% had children under the age of 18 living with them, 43.0% were married couples living together, 11.7% had a female householder with no husband present, and 37.11% were non-families. 33.54% of households were one person, and 16.35% were one person aged 65 or older. The average household size was 2.27 and the average family size was 2.84.

In the borough the population was spread out, with 18.71% under the age of 18, 3.78% from 18 to 20, 53.46% from 21 to 61, 5.25% from 62 to 64, and 18.8% 65 or older. The median age was 44.9 years. For every 100 females there were 99.1 males. For every 100 females age 18 and over, there were 100 males.

From the 2000 census, the median household income was $27,159 and the median family income was $38,229. Males had a median income of $29,107 versus $20,192 for females. The per capita income for the borough was $17,899. About 6.3% of families and 10.6% of the population were below the poverty line, including 17.0% of those under age 18 and 13.3% of those age 65 or over.

In 2000, 20.8% of New Philadelphia residents identified as being of Lithuanian heritage. This was the highest percentage of Lithuanian Americans per capita in the country.

History

New Philadelphia had historically been an anthracite mining town.

Because of the high number of Lithuanians and Irish in the area, there was much separation of the two nationalities. This tension ultimately resulted in the forming of two separate Catholic churches; Sacred Heart (Lithuanian) and Holy Family (Irish). There was also a town-wide brawl that occurred as a result of this tension. The dispute was settled by the priests from Sacred Heart and Holy Family calling their respective patrons to stop fighting and buying each other a beer.

In 2008, the two Catholic parishes were merged to create Holy Cross Roman Catholic Church.

In 2012, the Souls Harvest Baptist Church relocated to New Philadelphia from Port Carbon. They are now located at the corner of Kimber and Clay streets in the building that once housed a Methodist church. This building is the oldest building in town.

Gallery

References

Populated places established in 1840
Boroughs in Schuylkill County, Pennsylvania
1868 establishments in Pennsylvania